Camporotondo may refer to:

 Camporotondo Etneo, municipality in the Metropolitan City of Catania in the Italian region Sicily, Italy
 Camporotondo di Fiastrone, municipality in the Province of Macerata in the Italian region Marche, Italy